Giovanni Ciccotti (born 19 December 1943, in Rome Italy) is an Italian physicist.

Ciccotti held the position of Professor of the Structure of Matter at the University of Rome La Sapienza until 2013. He is the author of more than a hundred articles on molecular dynamics and statistical mechanics. He worked with J.P. Ryckaert on new methods for molecular dynamics on constrained systems. See also SHAKE algorithm.

He has edited several books on molecular dynamics and statistical mechanics developments, including:

  "Molecular Dynamics Simulation of Statistical Mechanical Systems", E. Fermi 1985 Summer School. G. Ciccotti and W. G. Hoover Eds. North Holland, Amsterdam, 1986.
 "Simulation of Liquids and Solids. Molecular Dynamics and MonteCarlo Methods in Statistical Mechanics. A reprint Book". G. Ciccotti, D. Frenkel and I. R. Mc Donald, Eds. North Holland, Amsterdam, 1987.
 "MonteCarlo and Molecular Dynamics of Condensed Matter Systems", Euroconference 1995, K. Binder and G. Ciccotti, Eds., SIF, Bologna, 1996.
 "Simulation of Classical and Quantum Dynamics in Condensed Phase", Euroconference 1997, B. J. Berne, G. Ciccotti and D. F. Coker, Eds. World Scientific, Singapore, 1998.

References

External links
 

1943 births
Living people
Academic staff of the Sapienza University of Rome
20th-century Italian physicists